The A4214 is a ring-road around Llanelli in Carmarthenshire, west Wales.

The route begins at the junction with Hall Street and Gelli-onn, on the A484 road in northwest Llanelli.  At this point, the road is a dual-carriageway as it heads south-east along Hall Street to the Public Library, then south-west along Church Street and past the town council, government buildings, then south-east again past the town hall and county council offices.  Here, the road turns into a single-carriageway as it becomes Station Road to the junction with the B4303 and Queen Victoria Road.  The road takes a 90-degree to the north-east along Murray Street towards the Asda Supermarket.

Following construction of the Asda Supermarket in the middle of the town centre, the road takes a detour around the car-park, first running south-east along Bres Road, then north-east along Upper Robinson Street then north-west along Stepney Place, before rejoining the original route.  The road then continues north-east until it reaches Swansea Castle Roundabout, with the junction of the A484.

Inside this ring-road is the main commerce area of Llanelli, including the shopping centre, supermarket, indoor and outdoor markets, bus-station, high street shops as well as multi-story, off-street and street parking. 

Transport in Carmarthenshire
Roads in Wales